Ronnie Damien Jackson (born May 9, 1953 in Birmingham, Alabama) is a coach and a former player in Major League Baseball. He was the hitting coach for the Boston Red Sox in 2004 when they won their first World Series in 86 seasons.

From 1975 through 1984, Jackson  played first base and third base with the California Angels (1975–78, 1982–84), Minnesota Twins (1979–81), Detroit Tigers (1981) and Baltimore Orioles (1984). He batted and threw right-handed.

Jackson was called up to the Angels after hitting .281 in 144 games for the Salt Lake City Gulls of the Pacific Coast League, and made his major league debut on September 12, 1975.

In  a 10-year career, Jackson compiled a .259 batting average with 56 home runs and 342 RBI in 926 games.

Jackson played for managers Gene Mauch, Sparky Anderson, Dick Williams and Jim Fregosi. With the Angels, he hit a career-high .297 in 1978, and in 1979 posted personal highs in hits (158), doubles (40), home runs (14), RBI (68), runs (85) and games (153) for Minnesota. In that season, his .9943 fielding percentage at first base broke Rod Carew's Twins' record.

Following his retirement as a player, Jackson coached for the Brewers, Dodgers and White Sox systems. The 2006 season marked his 18th year as a major league or minor league hitting coach, and his fourth with the Boston Red Sox. In his first two seasons with Boston, the Red Sox led the majors in runs, batting average, doubles, extra-base hits, total bases, on-base percentage and slugging average. In 2003 the Sox set ML records for extra-base hits, total bases and slugging, finishing one off the major league lead with 238 home runs.  The Red Sox tied an ML record with 373 doubles in 2004.

Jackson served as the hitting coach for the Round Rock Express, then the top affiliate of the Houston Astros from 2007 to 2009.

He currently serves as a guest instructor at the New York Baseball Academy and coached Birmingham's Willie Mays Youth Baseball team to the  2014 championship of the Junior RBI Classic in Minneapolis.

References

External links
, or Retrosheet
Pura Pelota

   

1953 births
Living people
African-American baseball coaches
African-American baseball players
American expatriate baseball players in Canada
Baltimore Orioles players
Baseball players from Birmingham, Alabama
Boston Red Sox coaches
California Angels players
Chicago White Sox coaches
Detroit Tigers players
El Paso Diablos players
El Paso Sun Kings players
Fort Myers Sun Sox players
Idaho Falls Angels players
Louisville Redbirds players
Major League Baseball first basemen
Major League Baseball hitting coaches
Milwaukee Brewers coaches
Minnesota Twins players
Minor league baseball coaches
Quad Cities Angels players
Rochester Red Wings players
Salt Lake City Gulls players
Spokane Indians players
Tiburones de La Guaira players
American expatriate baseball players in Venezuela
Vancouver Canadians players
21st-century African-American people
20th-century African-American sportspeople